Home Grown was a North American ska punk/pop punk band formed in 1994 in Orange County, California. They released three full-length albums and several EPs before disbanding in 2005. Their music is often characterized as pop punk, lyrically favoring humor and silly or satirical subjects.

Band history

Formation 
Home Grown was formed in Orange County in 1994. The original recording lineup of the band consisted of John "John E. Trash" Tran on guitar and vocals, Adam "Adumb" Lohrbach on bass and vocals, Ian "Slur" Cone on guitar and backing vocals, and Bob Herco on drums. The quartet began experimenting with elements of punk rock, pop, surf and skate music, and humorous lyrics to craft their sound. They released their first album, That's Business, the following year through Liberation Records. Though rudimentary, the album established the band's presence in the prolific southern California music scene of the 1990s and included several songs that became fan favorites, such as "Surfer Girl" and "Face in the Crowd". The band played many shows in southern California and embarked on some of their first tours. In 1996, the EP Wusappaning?! was released by Swedish label Burning Heart Records.

Act Your Age and lineup changes 
The band signed to major label Outpost Recordings and released its second album, Act Your Age, in 1998. It increased their popularity and they toured extensively in support of it. The album had peaked at #24 on Billboard's Heatseekers chart in 1998. During this era of the band, the song "We are Dumb" appeared on the soundtracks of movies Half Baked and Homegrown. Cone left the band shortly after and was replaced by Justin Poyser. This lineup released EP Phone Home in 1999, which included the punk version of aqua's barbie girl. Later that year they toured with the band Limbeck, with whom they recorded a split EP called Connection.

In March 2000, the band embarked on a US tour with Amazing Crowns, Limbeck, Pilfers, and the Gadjits. Around this time, the band released a split EP with Limbeck, through Utility Records. After returning home, they began writing material for their next album. Following this, the band were scheduled to go on a tour of the UK, which was ultimately canceled. Later in the year, Home Grown experienced significant lineup changes. Herco was forced to leave the group in order to undergo surgery and rehabilitation for a brain tumor. Poyser also left, leaving the band without a second guitar player. Lohrbach and Tran recruited Darren Reynolds from the band Longfellow as the new drummer, and spent some time searching for a suitable second guitarist. In addition, their label Outpost closed down and the band was without a recording contract. Eventually the band decided to continue as a trio without a second guitarist, and signed to the independent label Drive-Thru Records.

Kings of Pop 
In 2002, the band released Kings of Pop, its third album which gained nationwide recognition. Shortly after its release they added second guitarist Dan Hammond and filmed music videos for the songs "You're Not Alone" and "Kiss Me, Diss Me". They performed on the Drive-Thru stage on the Warped Tour and toured extensively in support of the album. In 2004, they released the EP When it All Comes Down, a more mature effort that abandoned the humorous topics of their previous releases in favor of more emotional subject matter.  The album was reissued in 2014 on 12" vinyl through Mutant League Records.

Break up 
In February 2005, Lohrbach left Home Grown and later joined the band New Years Day. The band continued without him for a time, playing live shows with guest bass guitarist Ted Vega. Eventually, however, the members moved on to other projects. Tran started the band Red Panda with Bill Uechi of Save Ferris, Hammond joined Paper Models, and Reynolds started Defender. Herco resurfaced in 2004 playing drums with a shortlived band by the name of Ugly, out of Orange, CA. In 2006, Home Grown's official website closed down and their MySpace profile announced that they were on "indefinite hiatus". The band has not played together or recorded since October 2005. Despite this, a new song, "Nothing Can Stop Us", was posted to their Myspace in March 2006.

Band members 

John Tran (aka John E. Trash) – guitar, lead vocals (1994–2005)
Adam "Adumb" Lohrbach – bass guitar, lead vocals (1994–2005)
Ian "Slur" Cone – guitar, backing vocals (1994–1999)
Bob Herco – drums (1994–2000)
Justin Poyser – guitar, backing vocals (1999–2000)
Darren Reynolds – drums (2000–2005)
Dan Hammond – guitar (2002–2005)

Discography

Albums

EPs & 7" vinyl

Non-album tracks

Videography

Music videos

Chart positions

References

External links 
Official Myspace profile
Drive-Thru Records

Musical groups from Orange County, California
Pop punk groups from California
Drive-Thru Records artists